Attila Tassi (born 14 June 1999) is a Hungarian racing driver currently competing in the World Touring Car Cup. Having previously competed in the SEAT León Eurocup, TCR International Series and Hungarian Suzuki Cup.

Racing career
Tassi began his career in 2012 in the Hungarian Suzuki Cup, he raced there until 2015. He switched to the SEAT León Eurocup for 2015, finishing 25th in the championship standings.

In February 2016 it was announced that he would race in the TCR International Series, driving a SEAT León TCR for B3 Racing.

In March 2017 it was announced that he would continue racing in the TCR International Series, but he would switch to Honda Civic TCR for M1RA.

Racing record

Career summary

‡ Team Standings

* Season still in progress.

Complete TCR International Series results
(key) (Races in bold indicate pole position) (Races in italics indicate fastest lap)

† Driver did not finish the race, but was classified as he completed over 75% of the race distance.

Complete TCR Europe Touring Car Series results
(key) (Races in bold indicate pole position) (Races in italics indicate fastest lap)

Complete World Touring Car Cup results
(key) (Races in bold indicate pole position) (Races in italics indicate fastest lap)

† Driver did not finish the race, but was classified as he completed over 90% of the race distance.

References

External links
 

1999 births
Living people
TCR International Series drivers
Hungarian racing drivers
Sportspeople from Budapest
World Touring Car Cup drivers
SEAT León Eurocup drivers
KCMG drivers
24H Series drivers
Engstler Motorsport drivers
TCR Europe Touring Car Series drivers